The year 2018 is the 26th year in the history of the Ultimate Fighting Championship (UFC), a mixed martial arts promotion based in the United States and founded in November 1993. This year, the UFC celebrated its 25th anniversary, and an anniversary event was held on November 10, 2018 in Denver, Colorado, the city where the historical UFC 1 was held.

Title fights

The Ultimate Fighter
The following The Ultimate Fighter seasons are scheduled for broadcast in 2018:

Debut UFC fighters

The following fighters fought their first UFC fight in 2018:

Abu Azaitar - UFC Fight Night 134
Adam Yandiev - UFC Fight Night 136
Alex Gorgees - UFC Fight Night 142
Alexander Hernandez - UFC 222
Alexey Kunchenko - UFC Fight Night 136
Allan Zuñiga - TUF 27 Finale
Anderson dos Santos - UFC Fight Night 140
Andre Ewell - UFC Fight Night 137
Andrea Lee - UFC Fight Night 129
Antonina Shevchenko - TUF 28 Finale
Augusto Sakai - UFC Fight Night 137
Austin Arnett - UFC on Fox 27
Bevon Lewis - UFC 232
Blagoy Ivanov  - UFC Fight Night 133
Bobby Moffett - UFC Fight Night 139
Brad Katona - TUF 27 Finale
Brandon Davis - UFC 220
Bryce Mitchell - TUF 27 Finale
Carlo Pedersoli Jr. - UFC Fight Night 130
Chance Rencountre - UFC Fight Night 131
Charles Byrd - UFC Fight Night 127
Chris Fishgold - UFC Fight Night 138
Chris Gutiérrez - TUF 28 Finale
Christos Giagos - UFC Fight Night 137
Cory Sandhagen - UFC on Fox 27
Craig White - UFC Fight Night 130
Curtis Millender - UFC Fight Night 126
Damir Ismagulov - UFC Fight Night 142
Dan Ige  - UFC 220
Dan Moret - UFC on Fox 29
Darko Stošić  - UFC Fight Night 134
David Zawadao - UFC Fight Night 134
Devonte Smith - UFC Fight Night 139
Dmitriy Sosnovskiy - UFC Fight Night 127
Edmen Shahbazyan - TUF 28 Finale
Don Madge - UFC Fight Night 138
Dwight Grant - UFC on Fox 31
Elias Garcia - UFC Fight Night 133
Geoff Neal - UFC Fight Night 126
Hakeem Dawodu - UFC Fight Night 127
Hannah Cifers - UFC Fight Night 139
Hector Aldana - UFC Fight Night 132
Ian Heinisch - UFC Fight Night 140
Israel Adesanya - UFC 221
Jalin Turner - UFC 229
Jay Cucciniello - TUF 27 Finale
Jennifer Maia  - UFC Fight Night 133
Jesus Pinedo - UFC Fight Night 140
Jimmy Crute - UFC Fight Night 142
Jin Soo Son - UFC Fight Night 136
Joe Giannetti - TUF 27 Finale
John Gunther - TUF 27 Finale
John Phillips - UFC Fight Night 127
Jonathan Martinez - UFC Fight Night 138
Johnny Walker - UFC Fight Night 140
Jordan Griffin - UFC on Fox 31
Jose Torres - UFC Fight Night 131
Juan Adams - UFC on Fox 31
Juan Espino - TUF 28 Finale
Julija Stoliarenko - TUF 28 Finale
Julio Arce - UFC 220
Justin Frazier - TUF 28 Finale
Kai Kara-France - UFC Fight Night 142
Kevin Aguilar - TUF 28 Finale
Kevin Holland - UFC 227
Khalid Murtazaliev - UFC Fight Night 136
Khalid Taha - UFC Fight Night 134
Kyle Nelson - UFC 231
Laureano Staropoli - UFC Fight Night 140
Lauren Mueller - UFC on Fox 29
Leah Letson - TUF 28 Finale
Livia Renata Souza - UFC Fight Night 137
Luigi Vendramini - UFC Fight Night 137
Luis Peña - TUF 27 Finale
Nathaniel Wood - UFC Fight Night 131
Mackenzie Dern - UFC 222
Macy Chiasson - TUF 28 Finale
Magomed Ankalaev - UFC Fight Night 127
Maia Stevenson - UFC Fight Night 125
Manny Bermudez UFC on Fox 28
Mike Rodríguez - UFC Fight Night 137
Marcin Prachnio - UFC on Fox 28
Martin Day - UFC Fight Night 141
Maycee Barber - UFC Fight Night 139
Matt Bessette - UFC 220
Matt Frevola - UFC Fight Night 124
Matt Sayles - UFC 227
Mayra Bueno Silva - UFC Fight Night 137
Maurice Greene - TUF 28 Finale
Megan Anderson - UFC 225
Michel Batista - TUF 28 Finale
Mike Jackson - UFC 225
Mike Rodriguez - UFC 223
Michael Trizano - TUF 27 Finale
Molly McCann - UFC Fight Night 130
Montel Jackson - UFC 227
Su Mudaerji - UFC Fight Night 141
Nad Narimani - UFC Fight Night 134
Pannie Kianzad - TUF 28 Finale
Petr Yan - UFC Fight Night 132
Pingyuan Liu - UFC Fight Night 134
Polyana Viana - UFC Fight Night 125
Priscila Cachoeira - UFC Fight Night 125
Ricky Rainey - UFC on Fox 29
Raoni Barcelos  - UFC Fight Night 133
Richie Smullen - TUF 27 Finale
Ricky Simon - UFC Fight Night 128
Roosevelt Roberts - TUF 28 Finale
Ryan Spann - UFC Fight Night 137
Said Nurmagomedov  - UFC Fight Night 133
Sergei Pavlovich - UFC Fight Night 141
Sijara Eubanks - UFC Fight Night 131
Sodiq Yusuff - UFC Fight Night 142
Stefan Sekulić - UFC Fight Night 136
Steven Peterson - UFC Fight Night 126
Suman Mokhtarian - UFC Fight Night 142
Te'Jovan Edwards - UFC Fight Night 138
Thiago Moisés - UFC Fight Night 139
Tim Williams - UFC Fight Night 126
Tyler Diamond - TUF 27 Finale
Vince Morales - UFC Fight Night 141
Wu Yanan - UFC Fight Night 122
Yana Kunitskaya - UFC 222
Weili Zhang - UFC 227

Events list

See also
 UFC
 List of UFC champions
 List of UFC events
 List of current UFC fighters

References

External links
 UFC past events on UFC.com
 UFC events results at Sherdog.com

Ultimate Fighting Championship by year
2018 in mixed martial arts